Daniele Sommariva (born 18 July 1997) is an Italian professional footballer who plays as a goalkeeper for  club Pescara.

Coming through Genoa's youth sector, Sommariva started his senior career in 2016 at Nocerina in the Serie D, winning the honorific play-offs. In 2017 he moved to Bustese, before joining Monza in the Serie C, whom he helped gain promotion to the Serie B for the first time in 19 years. Sommariva joined Pescara in 2022.

Career

Early career 
Starting out his youth career at local club  aged nine, Sommariva signed for Genoa's youth team two years later. He remained at their youth sector until 2016.

On 1 August 2016, Sommariva joined Serie D club Nocerina. He played 24 league games in the 2016–17 season, winning the group G honorific play-offs. On 12 July 2017, he moved to Bustese—also in the Serie D—playing 29 league games in 2017–18.

Monza

2018–2020: Serie C 
On 11 July 2018, Serie C club Monza announced the signing of Sommariva. He made his debut for the club during the 2018–19 season, on 11 November 2018, in a 1–1 league draw to Vis Pesaro. Sommariva was Monza's goalkeeper for the Coppa Italia Serie C, where they finished runners-up after losing the finals to Viterbese.

The following season, Sommariva only featured in the Coppa Italia Serie C, without making an appearance in the league. After winning the Serie C, Monza were promoted to the Serie B for the first time in 19 years.

2020–2022: Serie B 
Starting as Monza's third-choice goalkeeper of the season, Sommariva made his Serie B debut on 20 October 2020, in a 1–1 draw to Pisa, due to the positivity of Eugenio Lamanna and Michele Di Gregorio—Monza's first-choice goalkeepers—to COVID-19. Sommariva also played the following game, on 24 October to Chievo, where Monza lost 2–1. On 27 October, he made his debut in the Coppa Italia against Pordenone in the third round. With Monza being reduced to 10 men, Sommariva kept a clean sheet throughout the 120 minutes (including extra time), and saved three of Pordenone's four penalties in the penalty shoot-out, to help Monza pass to the fourth round.

Despite Lamanna's return to the team, Sommariva kept his place as the first-choice keeper against Cittadella in the league; Monza won 2–1 in their first league win of the season.

Pescara 
On 13 July 2022, Sommariva joined Serie C side Pescara, alongside teammate Luca Lombardi, as part of a swap deal involving Alessandro Sorrentino moving the other way.

Career statistics

Honours 
Nocerina
 Serie D Group G play-offs: 2016–17

Monza
 Serie C Group A: 2019–20
 Coppa Italia Serie C runner-up: 2018–19

References 

1997 births
Living people
Footballers from Genoa
Italian footballers
Association football goalkeepers
Genoa C.F.C. players
A.S.D. Nocerina 1910
Milano City F.C. players
A.C. Monza players
Delfino Pescara 1936 players
Serie D players
Serie C players
Serie B players